Colonel John Edward Blackburn  (30 April 1851 – 29 September 1927) was a Scottish footballer and soldier.

In 1869, he entered the Royal Military Academy, Woolwich and was commissioned in the Royal Engineers in 1871. He played for the Royal Engineers A.F.C. and Scotland.

He was made a Companion of the Order of the Bath in  the 1917 New Year Honours for services during the First World War.

References

Sources

External links

London Hearts profile

1851 births
1927 deaths
Association football wingers
Companions of the Order of the Bath
FA Cup Final players
Footballers from Edinburgh
Royal Engineers A.F.C. players
Royal Engineers officers
Scotland international footballers
Scottish footballers